Wendy Hughes (29 July 19528 March 2014) was an Australian actress known for her work in theatre, film and television. Her career spanned more than forty years and established her reputation as one of Australia's finest and most prolific actors. In her later career she acted in Happy New Year along with stars Peter Falk and Charles Durning. In 1993 she played Dr. Carol Blythe, M. E. in Homicide: Life on the Street. In the late 1990s, she starred in State Coroner and Paradise Road.

Career
Born in Melbourne, Australia to English-born parents, Hughes originally studied to become a ballerina but during her teenage years she turned her focus to acting and later graduated from the National Institute of Dramatic Art (NIDA) and, after honing her skills with the Melbourne Theatre Company, had her first film role in Petersen (1974). During the early 1970s she also had her first television parts, including appearing in Power Without Glory, a television series first broadcast in 1976.

Called "one of the most important players in the development and productivity of Australian film", Hughes worked closely with prominent Australian artists such as the cinematographer John Seale and the writers David Williamson and Bob Ellis. She was one of the leading players in the 1970s' "New Australian Film" renaissance.

As an actress
Hughes's first internationally known role was the character Patricia in Lonely Hearts (1982). This role commenced a decades-long collaboration with the Dutch-Australian director Paul Cox.

As one of the leading actresses in Australian cinema, Hughes's roles in the 1970s and 1980s included those in Newsfront, Kostas, My Brilliant Career, Lucinda Brayford, Touch and Go, Hoodwink, Lonely Hearts, Careful, He Might Hear You, My First Wife, I Can't Get Started, An Indecent Obsession, Echoes of Paradise, Boundaries of the Heart, Warm Nights on a Slow Moving Train (1988) and Luigi's Ladies.

Hughes made her American debut in 1987 in John G. Avildsen's film Happy New Year opposite Peter Falk and Charles Durning. In 1989 she starred opposite Pierce Brosnan in The Heist, a TV movie made by HBO. She continued to make occasional appearances on television, such as playing Jilly Stewart in the mini-series Return to Eden in 1983. During the early 1990s, she spent time in the United States, where she played medical examiner Dr Carol Blythe in the television series Homicide: Life on the Street. She also appeared in the miniseries Amerika and made a guest appearance as Lieutenant Commander Nella Daren on Star Trek: The Next Generation, in the episode Lessons, as one of the few love interests that Captain Jean-Luc Picard had on the show. Back in Australia, Hughes played lead roles on television in The Man From Snowy River ("Snowy River: The McGregor Saga") and State Coroner. Hughes's film appearances at this approximate time included the fact-based comedy-drama Princess Caraboo and Paradise Road. Her later film roles included Salvation (2007), The Caterpillar Wish (2006) and The Man Who Sued God (2001).

Stage appearances by Hughes during this time included as Mrs. Robinson in the 2001 Melbourne version of The Graduate, Martha in a 2007 staging of Who's Afraid of Virginia Woolf? by the Melbourne Theatre Company, the character of Honor in Honour in 2010, and Henry Higgins's mother in Pygmalion (2012).

Her last TV appearance was in Miss Fisher's Murder Mysteries.

Awards
She was nominated for Australian Film Institute acting awards six times, and won the Best Lead actress award in 1983 for her performance in Careful, He Might Hear You.

Personal life
Hughes had two children, a son with restaurateur Patric Juillet and a daughter Charlotte with actor Chris Haywood. She was also married to actor Sean Scully for a short time.

Death
Hughes died of cancer on 8 March 2014, aged 61. Actor Bryan Brown announced her death to an audience attending the play Travelling North in Sydney that afternoon, asking the audience to join him in a standing ovation in tribute to the late actress.

Filmography 
FILM

TELEVISION:
{|class="wikitable
|-
|Year
|Title
|Role
|Type
|-
| 1967-1972
| Homicide
| Guest roles: Barbara Carlisle / Jan Smith / Rosalind Eyre / Helen Raynor / Darlene Sadler / Julie Smith
| TV series, 6 episodes
|-
| 1968
| Hunter
| Guest role: Sue Gallagher
| TV series, 1 episode
|-
| 1971
| The Group
| Guest role: Laura Bent
| TV series, 1 episode
|-
| 1971-1976
| Matlock Police
| Guest roles: Jill Perry / Joanna / Fran Carmody / Patti Anderson
| TV series, 5 episodes
|-
| 1972
| A Time For Love
| Role unknown
| TV series
|-
| 1972
| All About Faces
| Herself
| TV series
|-
| 1974
| A Touch of Reverence
| Lead role
| ABC TV miniseries, 3 episodes
|-
| 1974
| Eye of the Spiral aka 'The Spiral Bureau'
| Lead role
| TV film
|-
| 1974
| The Cherry Orchard
| Role unknown
| Teleplay
|-
| 1974
| Essington
| Lead role
| TV film
|-
| 1975
| Behind the Legend
| Role unknown
| ABC TV series, Series 3 1 episode 10: 'Christopher Brennan'
|-
| 1975
| Number 96
| Guest role: Vanessa Harrison
| TV series, 1 episode
|-
| 1975
| The Company Men
| Lead role: Jill Freeman
| ABC TV miniseries, 3 episodes
|-
| 1976
| Rush
| Guest role: Emma
| ABC TV series, 1 episode
|-
| 1976;1977
| The 18th Annual TV Week Logie Awards
| Herself - Presenter
| TV special
|-
| 1976
| Is There Anybody There?
| Lead role: Marianne Dickinson
| TV film
|-
| 1976
| The Outsiders
| Guest role: Susan Mayfield
| ABC TV series AUSTRALIA/WEST GERMANY, 1 episode
|-
| 1976
| The Alternative
| Lead role: Melanie Hilton
| TV film
|-
| 1976
| Power Without Glory
| Regular role: Mary West
| ABC TV miniseries, 12 episodes
|-
| 1977
| The 19th Annual TV Week Logie Awards
| Herself
| TV special
|-
| 1977
| Graham Kennedy's Blankety Blanks
| Herself - Panelist
| TV series, 3 episodes
|-
| 1978
| A Woman In The House
| Role unknown
| TV film
|-
| 1978
| Puzzle
| Lead role: Claudine Cunningham
| ABC TV film
|-
| 1980
| Cop Shop
| Guest role: Marian McCall
| TV series, 1 episode
|-
| 1980
| Australian Theatre Festival: Coralie Landsdowne Says No
| Lead role: Coralie Landsdowne
| ABC Teleplay
|-
| 1980
| Lucinda Brayford
| Lead role: Lucinda Brayford
| ABC TV miniseries, 4 episodes
|-
| 1983
| Australian Movies to the World
| Herself
| TV special
|-
| 1983
| Return to Eden
| Lead role: Jilly Stewart
| TV miniseries, 3 episodes
|-
| 1983
| The 1983 Australian Film Awards
| Herself - Winner Best Actress 'Careful, He Might Hear You'
| ABC TV special
|-
| 1984
| Five Mile Creek
| Guest role: Arabella
| TV series, 1 episode 
|-
| 1985
| I Can't Get Started
| Lead role: Margaret
| TV film
|-
| 1985
| Remember Me
| Lead role: Jenny
| TV film
|-
| 1985
| Promises To Keep
| (uncredited)
| TV film, US
|-
| 1986
| The 1986 Australian Film Institute A.F.I. Awards
| Herself & Bob Ellis
| TV special
|-
| 1987
| Amerika
| Regular role: Marion Andrews
| TV miniseries US, 7 episodes
|-
| 1989
| The Heist
| Sheila
| TV film, US
|-
| 1989
| MTV Australia Awards
| Herself
| TV special
|-
| 1990
| Donor
| Dr. Farrell
| TV film, US
|-
| 1991
| Sukeban deka: Gyakushu-hen
| Additional Voices
| Video Game, JAPAN/US
|-
| 1991
| A Woman Named Jackie
| Support role: Janet Lee Bouvier
| TV miniseries US, 3 episodes
|-
| 1993
| Homicide: Life on the Street
| Recurring role: Dr. Carol Blythe, M.E.
| TV series US, 5 episodes
|-
| 1993
| Star Trek: The Next Generation
| Guest role: Lt. Cmdr. Nella Daren
| TV series US, 1 episode 19: 'Lessons'
|-
| 1994
| Blue Seed
| Additional Voices (voice)
| Animated TV series, JAPAN
|-
| 1994-1996
| Banjo Paterson's The Man From Snowy River aka 'Snowy River: The McGregor Saga'
| Lead role: Kathleen O'Neil / Kathleen McGregor
| TV series, 52 episodes
|-
| 1995
| Golden Boy: Sasurai no o-benkyo yaro
| Employee C (voice)
| TV series, JAPAN
|-
| 1995
| Denton
| Herself - Guest
| TV series, 1 episode
|-
| 1996
| State Coroner
| Lead role: State Coroner Kate Ferrari
| TV pilot
|-
| 1997-2001
| Good Morning Australia
| Herself - Guest
| TV series, 4 episodes
|-
| 1997-1998
| State Coroner
| Regular lead role: State Coroner Kate Ferrari
| TV series, 28 episodes
|-
| 1997
| Monday to Friday
| Herself - Guest
| TV series, 1 episode
|-
| 1997
| Melbourne Cup Carnival
| Herself - Guest
| TV special
|-
| 2000,2001
| Good Morning Australia
| Herself - Guest
| TV series, 2 episodes
|-
| 2002
| The Man Who Sued God Discovery
| Herself - Actress
| Video
|-
| 2004
| High Rolling: Interviews with Cast and Crew
| Herself - Actress / Barbie
| Video
|-
| 2004
| Petersen: Cast and Crew Interviews
| Herself - Actress
| Video
|-
| 2005
| MDA
| Lead role: Gabrielle Bromley
| ABC TV film series, 4 episodes
|-
| 2006
| Two Twisted
| Lead role: Barber's Wife
| TV film series, 1 episode 5: 'Von Stauffenberg's Stamp'
|-
| 2006
| Wendy Hughes Discusses... An Indecent Obsession
| Herself - Actress / Honour Langtry
| Video
|-
| 2006
| The Caterpillar Wish: Behind the Scenes
| Herself - Actress
| Video
|-
| 2006
| Looking Back at 'Hoodwink| Herself
| Video
|-
| 2006
| A Dangerous Summer: Rekindled
| Herself
| Video
|-
| 2007
| A Wire Through the Heart
| Herself - Narrator
| TV documentary
|-
| 2007
| Constructing Australia
| Herself - Narrator
| ABC TV documentary series, 3 episodes
|-
| 2007
| Warm Nights on a Slow Moving Train: A Journey with Wendy Hughes
| Herself - Actress
| Video
|-
| 2007
| The Making of Lonely Hearts
| Herself
| Video
|-
| 2007
| The Fabric of a Dream: The Fletcher Jones Story
| Herself - Narrator (voice)
| TV documentary
|-
| 2007
| City Homicide
| Guest role: Victoria Semple
| TV series, 1 episode
|-
| 2007
| The Bridge
| Narrator (voice)
| ABC TV documentary
|-
| 2007
| Talking Heads
| Herself - Guest
| ABC TV series, 1 episode
|-
| 2008
| The Saddle Club
| Guest role: Louise Lomax  (as Wendy Hughs)
| TV series, 1 episode
|-
| 2008
| Duet For Four: Wendy Hughes Interview
| Herself
| Video
|-
| 2008
| Kerri-Anne
| Herself - Guest
| TV series, 1 episode
|-
| 2008
| Not Quite Hollywood: Deleted and Extended Scenes
| Herself
| Video
|-
| 2009
| All Saints
| Guest role: Annalise Lang
| TV series, 1 episode
|-
| 2009
| Darwin's Brave New World
| Herself - Narrator 
| TV series, 3 episodes
|-
| 2012
| Miss Fisher's Murder Mysteries
| Guest role: Adele Freeman
| ABC TV series, 1 episode
|}STAGE/THEATRE'''
 Butterflies Are Free (1971)
 An Ideal Husband (1976)
 Batman's Beachhead (1976)
 Cat On A Hot Tin Roof (1981)
 Present Laughter (1983)
 Happy Days - The Musical (1999-2000)
 The Graduate (2001)
 Who's Afraid Of Virginia Woolf? (2007;2013)
 Honour (2010;2013)
 Pygmalion'' (2012)

References

External links
 

1952 births
2014 deaths
Australian film actresses
Australian people of English descent
Australian television actresses
Actresses from Melbourne
Deaths from cancer in New South Wales
Best Actress AACTA Award winners
Logie Award winners
National Institute of Dramatic Art alumni